Doug Grant may refer to:

Doug Grant (footballer) (born 1938), Scottish footballer
Doug Grant (ice hockey) (born 1948), Canadian ice hockey player

See also
Douglas Grant (1885–1951), Australian soldier